Swimming has featured as a sport at the European Youth Summer Olympic Festival since its first edition in 1991. It has appeared on the programme at every subsequent edition of the biennial multi-sport event for European athletes under the age of 18.

Editions

Festival records

Boys

Girls

Mixed

References

 
European Youth Summer Olympic Festival
Sports at the European Youth Summer Olympic Festival